Ratan Lal Brahmachary(1932 - 13 February 2018) was a distinguished biochemist and a pioneer of tiger pheromone studies in India. He was widely known for his research in pheromones, although his academic background based on Physics, specifically on astrophysics under guidance of S.N. Bose. Brahmachary made significant contributions in tiger behavioral studies researching the animal for over 50 years. He studied many species of wildlife, notably big cats and undertook research trips to his favourite continent Africa fourteen times. Brahmachary studied ethology in the Amazon basin in South America and Borneo, Indonesia with an ardent admirer of entomologist Gopal Chandra Bhattacharya.

He once said in an interview

He died in pneumonia on 13 February 2018 in a city Nursing home in Kolkata, India. Brahmachary had pledged his body to medical research. After paying respect his body was handed over to Radha Govinda Kar Hospital authorities.

Early life and education
Ratan Lal Brahmachary belongs to Bengali Hindu family. He was born in Dhaka, Bengal, British India (now in Bangladesh ) in 1932.

Professor Brahmachary's early education was in Calcutta, Dacca and Hamburg. He was an astrophysicist. He was a student of the eminent Indian theoretical physicist Satyendra Nath Bose. However, since 1960 he moved into biology, making significant original contributions to molecular embryology, and later, since late 1970s became an ecologist, studying mammalian pheromones, at the Indian Statistical Institute under its founder Prasanta Chandra Mahalanobis.

As a biochemist

Following a decade of work on relativistic field theory Astrophysist, Professor Ratan Lal Brahmachary joined Indian Statistical Institute in 1957 and there he was professor of Biology Department and a veteran on tiger research. He did his extensive research in Marine Biological Labs in Italy, France and other institutes in Europe.

Professor Brahmachary's early work was on molecular embryology of invertebrates, and in the 1970s, during a series of visits to Africa, studied food habits of mountain Gorilla. For more than 30 years since 1979, his major research emphasis was on pheromones of tigers and other big cats. He was interested in Animal Behaviour long before the subject was introduced in this part of the world. To observe wildlife, he visited Africa 14 times. He also worked in the Amazon area and Borneo and in the Mediterranean and Andaman Islands.

Notable works

On biochemistry

Tiger pheromones
He was among the first scientists to observe the scent-marking behaviour of tigers, where the animals spray urine on tree branches to mark their territories and communicate via biochemical messengers. Brahmachary, along with Jyotirmoy Dutta of Bose Institute, Kolkata made the first comprehensive approach towards understanding the nature of big cat pheromones. After Years long researched on Synthesising the chemical nature of tiger urine (marking fluid), he found out that the molecule 2 acetyl-1-pyrroline (2AP) was present in tiger urine (marking fluid) and was the very same molecule that imparts the beautiful aroma to fragrant varieties of rice like basmati.

Human pheromone
Professor Brahmachary gave his opinion on human pheromone. In an interview he expressed

Scented and non-scented mung bean
Mung bean is a widely consumed legume of India as well as of Asia. In India, two varieties of this bean, scented and non-scented, are available. The scented variety produces a beautiful aroma when fried, boiled or cooked. Professor Brahmachari researched on this phenomenon with Moumita Pal and Mahua Ghosh. This study was carried out for comparison of the physicochemical and biochemical characteristics of these two varieties.

On physics
Professor Brahmachari did a research on 
"Solution of the Combined Gravitational and Mesic Field Equations in General Relativity". Which was published in 1960 in Progress of Theoretical Physics.

Born Free Foundation
He was one of the founder patron of Zoo Check. Now it is the Born Free Foundation since 1984. Brahmachary always believed that "wildlife belongs in the wild and strongly stood for compassionate treatment of animals in research". About Born free foundation he told in an interview

Books
He wrote several books in Bangla to promote the cause of wildlife protection and scientific observation of animal behaviour. most notable books are listed below.
 আফ্রিকার জঙ্গলে বারো বার (Africar Jongoley Barobar) (translation in English Twelve Visits to the African Jungle)
 বাঘ সিংহ হাতি (Bagh, Shingha, Haathi) (translation in English Tiger, Lion and Elephant)

His academic book My Tryst With Big Cats is quite popular among tiger studies scholars.

Summary of his last work on tiger phenomenon was published in a book named The Neurobiology of Chemical Communication. This book edited by Carl Mucignat Caretta on 2014.

Award
For his contributions to science popularisation, he received the coveted state prize of West Bengal Rabindra Puraskar. He also got D.Sc. degree from the University of Calcutta in 2008.

Notes

References

1932 births
2018 deaths
Indian biochemists
People from Dhaka
University of Calcutta alumni
Scientists from Kolkata